Bauscher is a surname. Notable people with the surname include:

Matt Bauscher (born 1985), American basketball player
Otto Bauscher (1880–1959), British gymnast

See also
Buscher